Yongcheng (愛新覺羅 永珹, 21 February 1739 - 5 April 1777) was an imperial prince of Qing Dynasty.

Life 
Yongcheng was born on 21 February 1739 as the Qianlong Emperor's fourth son. His mother, Imperial Noble Consort Shujia, was entitled "Concubine Jia" at that time. In 1763, Qianlong Emperor decided to adopt him into Prince Lü peerage as a grandson of Yuntao, Kangxi Emperor's 12th son because all the children of the prince Lüyi died prematurely. Yongcheng held the title Prince Lü of the Second Rank until his death on 5 April 1777. He was posthumously honoured as Prince Lü Duan of the First Rank (履端親王; meaning "implementing in a dignified way") in 1799.

Family 
Primary Consort

 Imperial Princess Consort Luduan, of the Niohuru clan (履端亲王福晋 钮祜禄氏; 1751-1754)Titles: Primary Consort of the Fourth Prince (皇四子嫡福晋), Primary Consort of Prince Lu of the Second Rank (履郡王福晋), Imperial Princess Consort Luduan (履端亲王福晋)
 Step Imperial Princess Consort Luduan, of the Irgen Gioro clan (履端亲继王福晋 伊尔根觉罗氏, since 1754) Titles: Step Primary Consort of the Fourth Prince (皇四子继福晋), Step Primary Consort of Prince Lu of the Second Rank (履继郡王福晋), Step Imperial Princess Consort Luduan (履端亲继王福晋)

Secondary Consort

 Secondary consort, of the Wanyan clanTitles: Secondary Consort of Prince Lu of the Second Rank (履郡王侧福晋), Secondary Consort of Prince Luduan of the First Rank (履端亲王侧福晋)
 Mianhui, Prince Lu of the Second Rank (履郡王 绵惠; 20 October 1764 – 6 September 1796)
 Second son (31 May 1766 – 30 November 1766)
 Third son (10 October 1767 – 2 December 1769)
 Princess of the Fourth Rank (县主; 9 October 1769 – 4 July 1787), second daughter
 Married Wangqin Bambar of the Alxa Kalejiasi clan in 1785
 Fourth son (22 June 1771 – June/July 1771)
 Princess of the Fourth Rank (县主; b. 20 August 1776), third daughter
 Married Namqijal Dorji of the Aohan league in 1791

Concubine

 Mistress, of the Gao clan
 First daughter (28 July 1766 – 29 January 1767)

 Mistress, of the Xia clan
 Fifth son

 Mistress, of the Zhang clan
 Sixth son

Family tree

In popular culture 

 Portrayed by Fang Yanfei in "Story of Yanxi Palace" as Fourth Prince Yongcheng
 Portrayed by An Jie in "Ruyi's Royal Love in the Palace" as Fourth Prince Yongcheng

References

Further reading 

Qing dynasty imperial princes
Prince Lü
Chinese princes
Manchu nobility
Qianlong Emperor's sons